Joshua is a given name derived from the Hebrew  (Modern: Yəhōšūaʿ, Tiberian: Yŏhōšūaʿ), prominently belonging to Joshua, an early Hebrew leader of the Exodus period who has a major role in several books of the Bible. The name was a common alternative form of the name  (Yēšūaʿ) which corresponds to the Greek spelling Ἰησοῦς (Iesous), from which, through the Latin Iesus, comes the English spelling Jesus. As a result of the origin of the name, a majority of people before the 17th century who have this name were Jewish. A variant, truncated form of the name, Josh, gained popularity in the United States in the 1920s.

Popularity

Information from the United Kingdom's Office for National Statistics from 2003 to 2007 shows "Joshua" among the top-five given names for newborn males. In Scotland, the popularity of "Joshua" has been substantially lower than in the rest of the United Kingdom, appearing at rank 35 in 2000 and rising to rank 22 in 2006.

Biblical figures
Joshua, leader of the Israelites after the death of Moses
Jesus, known in his own tongue as Yeshua, an Aramaic form of Yehoshua (Joshua)
Joshua the High Priest, High Priest ca. 515–490 BC after the return of the Jews from the Babylonian Captivity

Ancient world
Ordered chronologically
Joshua ben Perachiah (given name  = Yehoshua), Nasi (prince) of the Sanhedrin in the latter half of the 2nd century BC
Joshua ben Hananiah (given name  = Yehoshua) (died 131), a tanna (sage)
Joshua ben Levi, Jewish amora (scholar) in the first half of the third century
Joshua the Stylite, author of a chronicle of the war between the Later Roman Empire and the Persians between 502 and 506

Medieval period
Joshua Lorki (fl. c. 1400), Spanish-Jewish physician

Modern era

Pre-20th century
Joshua Allen, 5th Viscount Allen (1728–1816), Irish nobleman
Joshua Barnes (1654–1712), English scholar
Joshua Bates (financier) (1788–1864), American international financier
Joshua Boaz ben Simon Baruch (died 1557), Talmudist in Spain and later Italy
Joshua Boyle, Irish Member of Parliament in 1641 and 1661
Joshua Harrison Bruce (1833-1891), American farmer and politician
Joshua dei Cantori, Italian converted Jew who attacked the Talmud in 1559
Joshua Caslari (fl. 1540–1558), French Jewish liturgical poet
Joshua Chamberlain (1828–1914), American brevet major general and professor, awarded the Medal of Honor for his actions in the Battle of Gettysburg
Joshua Clayton (1744–1798), American Continental Army officer, Governor of Delaware and U.S. Senator
Joshua Cooper (died 1757) (c. 1696–1757), Irish landowner and Member of Parliament
Joshua Cooper (1732–1800), Irish landowner and Member of Parliament
Joshua Edward Cooper (c. 1761–1837), Irish landowner and Member of Parliament
Joshua Gwillen Doan (1811–1839), farmer and tanner who participated in the Upper Canada Rebellion of 1837
Joshua Evans (Quaker minister) (1731–1798), American Quaker minister, journalist, and abolitionist
Joshua Evans Jr. (1777–1849), American politician and member of the U.S. House of Representatives from Pennsylvania
Joshua Falk (1555–1614), Polish Halakhist and Talmudist
Joshua Fisher (merchant) (1707–1783), American nautical mapmaker
Joshua Beal Ferris (1804–1886), American politician and US House Representative
Joshua Fry (1699–1754), early American mapmaker
Joshua Gilpin (1765-1841), American paper manufacturer
Joshua B. Howell, (1806–1864) American (Union) Civil War officer
Joshua Hughes (1807–1889), Welsh Anglican bishop
Joshua Johnson (painter) (1763–1824), American painter
Joshua Lewinsohn (1833–?), Lithuanian Jewish teacher and writer
Joshua A. Lowell (1801–1874), American politician
Joshua Millner (1849–1931), Irish Olympic shooter
 Joshua Abraham Norton (1818–1880), "Emperor Norton", English-born American immigrant who proclaimed himself Emperor of the United States
Joshua T. Owen (1822–1887), American (Union) Civil War brigadier general
Joshua C. Pierce (1830-1904), American businessman and politician
Joshua Reynolds (1723–1792), English painter, particularly of portraits
Joshua W. Sill (1831–1862), American (Union) Civil War brigadier general
Joshua Slocum (1844–1909), Canadian-American seaman, first man to sail solo around the world
Joshua Zeitlin (1742–1822), rabbinical scholar and philanthropist born in the Polish-Lithuanian Commonwealth (now Belarus)
Joshua Heschel Zoref (1633–1700), ascetic and an important figure in the Lithuanian Sabbatean movement

20th and 21st centuries
Josh Allen (disambiguation), multiple people
Joshua Ang (born 1989), Singaporean film actor
Josh Barnett (born 1977), American mixed martial artist and professional wrestler
Joshua Bartholomew (born 1984), Canadian singer-songwriter, musician and producer
Joshua Bassett (actor) (born 2000), American actor and singer
Josh Beckett (born 1980), American former Major League Baseball pitcher
Joshua Bell (born 1967), American violinist and conductor
Joshua Bloch (born 1961), American software engineer and author
Joshua Bradley (born 1992), British YouTuber (known online as Zerkaa), part of The Sidemen
Joshua Ilika Brenner (born 1976), Mexican swimmer
Josh Brolin (born 1968), American actor
Joshua Cardwell (1910–1982), politician in Northern Ireland
Joshua Chelanga (born 1973), Kenyan long-distance runner
Joshua Clottey (born 1977), Ghanaian professional boxer and former IBF welterweight champion
Josh Cooper (cryptographer) (1901–1981), British cryptographer
Josh Cooper (defensive end) (born 1980), American football player, formerly in the National Football League
Josh Culbreath (1932–2021), American hurdler
Joshua Dariye (born 1957), Nigerian politician
Joshua Dionisio (born 1994), Filipino actor
Joshua Dobbs (born 1995), American football player
Josh Duggar (born 1988), disgraced American reality TV participant and political activist
Josh Duhamel (born 1972), American actor and former model
Josh Dun (born 1988), American drummer, currently in the band Twenty One Pilots
Joshua Eagle (born 1973), Australian tennis coach and former player
Joshua Ezeudu (born 1999), American football player
Joshua Fishman (1926–2015), American linguist
Joshua Fox (born 1994), Fijian basketball player
Joshua Frazier (born 1995), American football player
Josh Gad (born 1981), American actor, voice actor, comedian, and singer
Joshua Garcia (born 1997), Filipino actor and model
Josh Gibson (1911–1947), American Negro league baseball catcher
Josh Gordon (born 1991), American football player, formerly in the National Football League
Joshua Oupa Gqozo (born 1952), former military ruler of the former homeland of Ciskei in South Africa
Joshua Green (disambiguation), multiple people
Josh Groban (born 1981), American singer, songwriter, actor and record producer
Joshua Gutiérrez (born 1987), Mexican actor
Joshua Guyer (born 1994), Australian professional baseball player
Josh Hamilton (born 1981), American Major League baseball player
Joshua Harrison (born 1995), Australian racing cyclist
Josh Hartnett (born 1978), American actor and movie producer
Joshua Holsey (born 1994), American football player
Josh Homme (born 1973), American singer, songwriter, musician, record producer and actor
Joshua Hong (born 1995), Korean-American singer, member of South Korean boy band  SEVENTEEN
Josh Howard (born 1980), American basketball player, formerly in the National Basketball Association
Josh Hutcherson (born 1992), American actor
Joshua Jackson (born 1978), Canadian-American actor
Josh Jobe (born 1998), American football player
Joshua Jones (disambiguation), multiple people
Josh Jasper (born 1987), All-American college football placekicker
Joshua Caleb Johnson, American actor
Joshua Johnson (disambiguation), multiple people
Joshua Kaindoh (born 1998), American football player
Joshua Kalu (born 1995), American football player
Joshua Kelley (born 1997), American football player
Joshua Kennedy (born 1982), Australian former soccer player
Joshua Kimmich (born 1995), German footballer 
Josh Kronfeld (born 1971), New Zealand former rugby union flanker
Joshua Livestro (born 1970), Dutch columnist and political writer
Josh Mahoney (born 1977), Australian rules footballer
Josh McDaniels (born 1976), American National Football League offensive coordinator and former head coach
Josh Middleton (born 1985), British musician, guitarist and vocalist of metal bands Sylosis and Architects
Joshua Miles (disambiguation), multiple people
Josh Morris (disambiguation), multiple people
Josh Mostel (born 1946), American actor
Joshua Neustein (born 1940), Polish-born American visual artist
Joshua Onujiogu (born 1998), American football player
Joshua Owusu (born 1948), Ghanaian retired triple jumper and long jumper
Joshua Palacios (born 1995), American professional baseball player
Josh Peck (born 1986), American actor
Josh Pence (born 1982), American actor
Joshua Perper (1932–2021), Romanian-born American forensic pathologist and toxicologist
Joshua Radin (born 1974), American singer-songwriter
Josh Radnor (born 1974), American actor, director, producer and screenwriter
Joshua Rush (born 2001), American actor
Josh Satin (born 1984), American former Major League Baseball player
Josh Server (born 1979), American actor and comedian
Joshua Simon (fl. 21st century), Israeli art curator, writer and filmmaker
Joshua Smith (disambiguation), multiple people
Josh Thomas (comedian) (born 1987), Australian comedian, actor and writer
Josh Tordjman (born 1985), Canadian hockey goaltender
Josh Wagenaar (born 1985), Canadian former footballer
Joshua Ward-Hibbert (born 1994), British basketball player and former tennis player
Joshua Wheeler (born 1975), American Delta Force Operator, first American service member killed in action while fighting ISIS
Josh Whitesell (born 1982), American former Major League Baseball and Nippon Professional Baseball player
Joshua Wong (born 1996), Hong Kong activist and politician
Josh Widdicombe, English stand-up comedian and presenter
Josh Wilcox (born 1974), American former National Football League player
Joshua Wilkerson (1992–2010), American murdered student
Joshua Youngblood (born 2001), American football player
Josh Zeid (born 1987), American baseball pitcher, formerly in Major League Baseball

Fictional characters
Josh Bauer (24), a minor character in season 6 of the American television series 24
Joshua Clay (debut 1977), DC Comics superhero Tempest
Joshua Deets (debut 1985), a recurring character in the Lonesome Dove American novel series
Joshua Giraffe, a song by Raffi from his 1980 album: Baby Beluga
Joshua Graham, a central character in the Honest Hearts expansion of Fallout: New Vegas
Josh Lyman (1999–2006), in the American television series The West Wing
Joshua, in the TV series Dark Angel
 Joshua Bright, a main character in the video game The Legend of Heroes: Trails in the Sky
Joshua "Josh" Washington, one of eight protagonists from the survival horror game Until Dawn
Joshua "Josh" Faraday, one from titular characters from remake of western The Magnificent Seven (2016 film)
Josh Wheeler, main character in the 2019 Netflix series Daybreak

See also
Josh (disambiguation)
Yehoshua (disambiguation)
Jesus (name)
Josuah Sylvester (1563–1618), English poet

References

English masculine given names
Hebrew-language names
Theophoric names
Modern names of Hebrew origin